Jeffrey Sheehan is a Canadian former freestyle and medley swimmer of the 1980s.

Sheehan, a Connecticut-born swimmer, won a bronze medal for Canada in the 200 metre medley at the 1982 Commonwealth Games in Brisbane. He swam for the University of Calgary and won a further bronze medal at the 1983 Summer Universiade in Edmonton as part of Canada's 4 x 100 metre freestyle relay team.

References

External links

Year of birth missing (living people)
Living people
Canadian male medley swimmers
Swimmers from Connecticut
Calgary Dinos players
Commonwealth Games bronze medallists for Canada
Commonwealth Games medallists in swimming
Medallists at the 1982 Commonwealth Games
Swimmers at the 1982 Commonwealth Games
Universiade bronze medalists for Canada
Universiade medalists in swimming
Medalists at the 1983 Summer Universiade